Taal Volcano Main Crater Lake (or simply Main Crater Lake), historically known as Yellow Lake, is a lake inside the main crater of Taal Volcano. The origin of the lake is uncertain but is thought to have formed by rainwater. The lake briefly disappeared after the 2020 eruption of Taal Volcano.

There is an island inside of Main Crater Lake, called Vulcan Point.

History

Disappearance 

After the January 12, 2020, eruption of Taal Volcano, satellite images showed that the water in Main Crater Lake had disappeared. Although the main cause of its disappearance is unknown, it is suggested that the water must have dried up due to the fissures that formed after the eruption. The lava beneath the volcano may also have contributed to the evaporation of the lake.

After Taal Volcano calmed down, a series of typhoons allowed rain to re-accumulate and reform Main Crater Lake.

Geography

Vulcan Point 

Vulcan Point Island, or simply Vulcan Point, is a small rocky island inside of Main Crater Lake which was once covered with vegetation before the 2020 eruption, which it survived. It is one of only a few islands in a lake on an island in a lake on an island in the world, of which the largest is an unnamed island located within Victoria Island in Canada. It projects from the surface underneath Main Crater Lake, which was the remnant of the old crater floor that was filled in by the lake.

References 

Lakes of the Philippines
Volcanic crater lakes